Alan James Hollinghurst  (born 26 May 1954) is an English novelist, poet, short story writer and translator. He won the 1989 Somerset Maugham Award, the 1994 James Tait Black Memorial Prize and the 2004 Booker Prize.

Early life and education
Hollinghurst was born in Stroud, Gloucestershire, only child of bank manager James Hollinghurst, who served in the RAF in the Second World War, and his wife, Elizabeth. He attended Dorset's Canford School.

He studied English at Magdalen College, Oxford, receiving a BA in 1975 and MLitt in 1979. His thesis was on works by three gay writers: Firbank, Forster and Hartley. He house-shared with future poet laureate Andrew Motion at Oxford, and was awarded poetry's Newdigate Prize, a year before Motion. In the late 1970s he lectured at Magdalen, then at Somerville and Corpus Christi. In 1981 he lectured at UCL, and in 1982 joined The Times Literary Supplement, serving as deputy editor: 1985–90.

Writing
Hollinghurst discussed his early life and literary influences at length in a rare interview at home in London, published in The James White Review in 1997–98.

He won the 2004 Booker Prize for The Line of Beauty. His next novel, The Stranger's Child, made the 2011 Booker Prize longlist.

List of works

Poetry
Isherwood is at Santa Monica (Sycamore Broadsheet 22: two poems, hand-printed on a single folded sheet), Oxford: Sycamore Press 1975
Poetry Introduction 4 (ten poems: "Over the Wall", "Nightfall", "Survey", "Christmas Day at Home", "The Drowned Field", "Alonso", "Isherwood is at Santa Monica", "Ben Dancing at Wayland's Smithy", "Convalescence in Lower Largo", "The Well"), Faber and Faber, 1978 
Confidential Chats with Boys, Oxford: Sycamore Press 1982 (based on the book Confidential Chats with Boys by William Lee Howard, MD., 1911, Sydney, Australia)
"Mud" (London Review of Books, Vol. 4, No. 19, 21 October 1982)

Short stories
A Thieving Boy (Firebird 2: Writing Today, Penguin, 1983)
Sharps and Flats (Granta 43, 1993), was incorporated into Hollinghurst's second novel, The Folding Star
Highlights (Granta 100, 2007)

Novels

The Swimming-Pool Library, 1988 
The Folding Star, 1994 
The Spell, 1998 
The Line of Beauty, 2004 
The Stranger's Child, 2011 
The Sparsholt Affair, 2017

Translations
Bajazet by Jean Racine, Chatto & Windus, 1991 
Bérénice and Bajazet by Jean Racine, Faber and Faber, 2012

As editor
New Writing 4 (with A. S. Byatt), 1995 
A. E. Housman: poems selected by Alan Hollinghurst, Faber and Faber, 2001

Foreword
Three Novels by Ronald Firbank, 2000

Awards and honours
1974: Newdigate Prize
1989: Somerset Maugham Award, for The Swimming Pool Library
1994: James Tait Black Memorial Prize, for The Folding Star
2004: Booker Prize, for The Line of Beauty
2011: Booker Prize, longlist for The Stranger's Child
2011: Bill Whitehead Award for Lifetime Achievement from Publishing Triangle

Personal life
Hollinghurst is gay and lives in London. Although he now lives with his partner Paul Mendez, Hollinghurst previously said: "I'm not at all easy to live with. I wish I could integrate writing into ordinary social life, but I don't seem to be able to. I could when I started [writing]. I suppose I had more energy then. Now I have to isolate myself for long periods."

References

External links
 An Interview at the Oxonian Review
  includes a "Critical Perspective" section
 Alan Hollinghurst at The New York Review of Books
 Alan Hollinghust Profile in The Guardian
 2011 radio interview at The Bat Segundo Show
 

1954 births
Living people
Academics of University College London
Alumni of Magdalen College, Oxford
Booker Prize winners
English gay writers
English LGBT novelists
English LGBT poets
English male non-fiction writers
English male novelists
English male poets
English male short story writers
English translators
Fellows of the Royal Society of Literature
Fellows of Magdalen College, Oxford
Fellows of Somerville College, Oxford
Fellows of Corpus Christi College, Oxford
James Tait Black Memorial Prize recipients
Lambda Literary Award for Debut Fiction winners
Lambda Literary Award for Gay Fiction winners
People educated at Canford School
People from Stroud
Stonewall Book Award winners
20th-century British short story writers
20th-century British translators
20th-century English male writers
20th-century English novelists
20th-century English LGBT people
21st-century British novelists
21st-century British short story writers
21st-century British translators
21st-century English male writers
21st-century English LGBT people
University of Houston faculty